Manuel María de los Santos Acosta Castillo (November 1, 1828 – January 9, 1901) was a Colombian General and political figure. He served as the president of Colombia from 1867 until 1868.

Biographic data 
Acosta was born in Miraflores, Boyacá, on November 1, 1828. He died in Bogotá on January 9, 1901.

Political career 
Although Acosta studied and graduated in medicine, he did not practice this profession. Rather, he pursued military and political careers. He was elected several times as MP, both to the House of Representatives and the Senate. Santos Acosta was one of the main players during the constitutional reform of 1853.

In 1867, Congress elected Acosta as second Vice-President. Congress had also elected Santos Gutiérrez as first Vice-President and Joaquín Riascos as third Vice-President.

References

Sources
 Santos Acosta at virtualology.com

1828 births
1901 deaths
Presidents of Colombia
Presidential Designates of Colombia
Colombian Liberal Party politicians
Burials at Central Cemetery of Bogotá